The 10.5 cm SK C/28 gun was developed by Germany during the late 1920s. It was the primary armament of the six Type 24 torpedo boats of the Reichsmarine.

Development and description
The gun was designed in 1928–1930 and entered service the latter year.

The gun was only used on the single-gun MPL C/30 mounting. It had a traverse of 360° and elevation limits of -10° and +30°. The manually operated mount could be traversed and elevated at a speed of 3° per second. The gun had a rate of fire of 15 rounds per minute.

Notes

Citations

Bibliography

External links
The SK C/28 on Navweaps.com

105 mm artillery
Naval guns of Germany